The Rock Island Railroad Bridge is BNSF Railway's bridge across the Columbia River, at Rock Island, Washington. The structure consists of one through truss, one deck truss, and an approach trestle.

History
The bridge was originally built in 1892 for the Great Northern Railway. Bridging the Columbia River was an important component in completing Great Northern's transcontinental link the following year. The site was chosen at Rock Island, Washington for being the shortest distance between the banks of the Columbia River in Washington state. In 1925, it was decided to strengthen the main span in anticipation of increased traffic and heavier trains by reinforcing the structure with an additional outside truss frame.

References

Bridges completed in 1892
Bridges in Douglas County, Washington
Great Northern Railway (U.S.) bridges
Railroad bridges in Washington (state)
Bridges over the Columbia River
BNSF Railway bridges
Railroad bridges on the National Register of Historic Places in Washington (state)
National Register of Historic Places in Douglas County, Washington
1892 establishments in Washington (state)
Trestle bridges in the United States